David Anthony Fleming (born November 7, 1969) is an American former professional baseball pitcher who played from 1991 to 1995, mostly for the Seattle Mariners of Major League Baseball (MLB).

Career
Fleming was born in Jackson Heights, Queens, New York, and went to high school in Mahopac. He pitched for the University of Georgia, leading them to a College World Series title in 1990.

Fleming was selected in the third round of the 1990 Major League Baseball draft by the Seattle Mariners. He won a career high 17 games, including nine consecutive, for the Mariners in his rookie season of 1992. His ERA that year was 3.39, and he took third place in the AL Rookie of the Year voting (behind winner Pat Listach).

After going 29-15 in his first two MLB seasons, Fleming began to struggle with arm trouble. On 7 July 1995, he was traded by the Mariners to the Kansas City Royals for Bob Milacki. He pitched only nine games for the Royals before undergoing surgery, and never pitched in the Major Leagues again.

Fleming is currently a fifth-grade teacher at Chatfield-LoPresti School in Seymour, Connecticut.

References

External links 

 Feature story about Fleming on ESPN.com

1969 births
Living people
American expatriate baseball players in Canada
Calgary Cannons players
Georgia Bulldogs baseball players
Gulf Coast Royals players
Jacksonville Suns players
Kansas City Royals players
Major League Baseball pitchers
Newburgh Black Diamonds players
Omaha Royals players
Pawtucket Red Sox players
People from Jackson Heights, Queens
People from Mahopac, New York
Rochester Red Wings players
San Bernardino Spirit players
Seattle Mariners players
Waterbury Spirit players
Schoolteachers from New York (state)
Sportspeople from Queens, New York
Baseball players from New York City